Richard Weldon may refer to:
Richard B. Weldon Jr. (born 1958), state senator in Maryland
Richard Chapman Weldon (1849–1925), Canadian law professor
Richard L. Weldon (born 1932), Canadian politician